Manoharbhai Patel Institute of Engineering and Technology (MIET) is a private self-financed technical institution affiliated to University of Nagpur and located in Gondia and Bhandara districts of Maharashtra, India.

Under the management of the former Minister of Civil Aviation (India), Praful Patel, the Institutes's Board of Directors  range from Mukesh Ambani of Reliance to Naresh Goyal of Jet Airways.

History 
The institution have two campus across the Vidarbha region of Maharashtra. The MIET, Gondia in 1983 and MIET, Shahapur, Bhandara in 2010 were established by Gondia Education Society, a private funded education society operating various schools and colleges in the region.

Accredited grade "A" by the Government of Maharashtra. Affiliated to Nagpur University with approval of All India Council of Technical Education (AICTE) and Council of Architecture, New Delhi.

Departments
 Civil Engineering
 Architecture
 Computer Engineering
 Electronics and Communication Engineering
 Information Technology
 Electronics Engineering
 Mechanical Engineering

References

 http://www.mietbhandara.ac.in
 http://www.mietgondia.in

External links
 Official website
 Official website

Engineering colleges in Maharashtra
Bhandara district
Educational institutions established in 2010
2010 establishments in Maharashtra
Gondia district
Educational institutions established in 1983
1983 establishments in Maharashtra